Archie N. Bradley (born August 10, 1992) is an American professional baseball pitcher who is a free agent. He has played in Major League Baseball (MLB) for the Arizona Diamondbacks, Cincinnati Reds,  Philadelphia Phillies and Los Angeles Angels.

Born and raised in Muskogee, Oklahoma, Bradley played baseball and football at Muskogee High School and Broken Arrow Senior High School. In his senior season, he pitched Broken Arrow to a state championship, and was named All-State Player of the Year by The Oklahoman. The Diamondbacks selected Bradley out of high school seventh overall in the 2011 MLB Draft, and he began his first full professional season with the Class A South Bend Silver Hawks. Bradley continued to rise through the Diamondbacks' farm system in 2013 and 2014, but general manager Kevin Towers resisted a push from Bradley's agent to send the pitcher to the MLB early, arguing that it would be too much pressure on the young pitcher to ask him to help the Diamondbacks' starting rotation.

After a 2015 debut in which he outpitched reigning Cy Young Award champion Clayton Kershaw, Bradley's first major league season was derailed by injuries: first a sinus fracture from being hit with a line drive, followed by shoulder tendinitis. He worked back through the minors on rehab assignments and returned to the starting rotation in 2016. The following season, amidst a strong group of starting pitchers, the Diamondbacks moved Bradley to the bullpen. He served as the setup man until mid-2019, when he became the team's closer.

At the 2020 trade deadline, Bradley was traded to the Cincinnati Reds in exchange for Josh VanMeter and Stuart Fairchild. He was one of four Reds players released into free agency at the conclusion of the season, and signed a one-year, $6 million contract with the Phillies in 2021. Despite rumors that he would take over from Héctor Neris as the Phillies' closer, Bradley was assigned to the setup position to start the season.

Early life 
Bradley was born on August 10, 1992, in Muskogee, Oklahoma. One of five children born to Charles and Pam Bradley, he began playing baseball at the age of four, and started playing gridiron football in elementary school. He was a hyperactive child, and his mother, the local school principal, would place him in classes with teachers that she believed could handle his excess energy.

After spending two years at Muskogee High School, Bradley transferred to Broken Arrow Senior High School for his junior and senior year. In his senior season, Bradley had a 12–1 win–loss record, an earned run average (ERA) of 0.29, a strikeouts per nine innings pitched (K/9) ratio of 17.29, and 137 strikeouts. He also led Broken Arrow in home runs, and had a .395 batting average. Bradley helped lead Broken Arrow to a 36–1 record in 2011, and struck out 14 batters in Broken Arrow's 4–0 shutout state championship victory over Owasso High School. At the end of the year, Bradley was named The Oklahoman's All-State Player of the Year. Along with baseball, Bradley excelled in football, participating in the 2010 Elite 11 quarterback competition. At this competition, Bradley was voted "Most Likely to be a Pro Athlete" by CFB counselors.

Professional career

Draft and minor leagues

The Arizona Diamondbacks of Major League Baseball (MLB) selected Bradley seventh overall in the 2011 MLB Draft. His friend and Owasso pitching rival Dylan Bundy was selected by the Baltimore Orioles fourth overall, making 2011 the first year that two Oklahoma high school students were drafted in the first round since 1973. At the time, Bradley had already committed to play baseball and football at the University of Oklahoma, and waited until the August 16 deadline to officially sign a $5 million, five-year contract with the Diamondbacks. Bradley spent the remainder of the 2011 season with the Missoula PaddleHeads of the Pioneer League, at that time the Rookie Advanced minor-league affiliate of the Diamondbacks. He appeared in two games for Missoula, including one start, and pitched four strikeouts against seven batters. Additionally, he pitched "about 15 innings" in the Arizona Instructional League.

Bradley started the 2012 season with the Class A South Bend Silver Hawks, taking the loss in his professional debut on April 6 after giving up one run in five innings of work to the Bowling Green Hot Rods. His first win came on April 12, giving up one run in six innings of a 3–1 victory over the Fort Wayne TinCaps. Bradley spent the entire season at South Bend, accumulating a 12–6 record and a 3.84 ERA in 27 starts and 136 innings of work. His 152-season strikeouts were second in the Midwest League, but he led the league in walks with 82.

Starting 2013 with the Class A-Advanced Visalia Rawhide, Bradley was named the California League Player of the Week for the week ending April 14, after striking out nine in  shutout innings against the San Jose Giants. He was promoted to the Double-A Mobile BayBears on May 1, after only five starts with Visalia, and took the win the following day in a 3–1 victory over the Huntsville Stars. Bradley pitched in all six innings of the game, which ended early due to inclement weather. He was named the Southern League Pitcher of the Week for the week ending August 4 after pitching the first nine-inning complete game of his career in a 5–1 rout of the Jackson Generals. The following week, he pitched the final inning in a combined no-hitter against Huntsville. Between Visalia and Mobile, Bradley finished the 2013 season with a 14–5 record, a 1.84 ERA, and 162 strikeouts in 152 innings.

After attending spring training with the Diamondbacks, Bradley was assigned to the Triple-A Reno Aces at the beginning of the 2014 season. His agent pushed for Bradley to be called up to the majors, arguing that Bradley was only being kept in the minor leagues to allow the Diamondbacks to retain his original contract for a longer period of time. Diamondbacks general manager Kevin Towers said that promoting Bradley would put unnecessary pressure on the pitcher, as the team had the worst ERA in the MLB, and Towers told Fox Sports that, "I know how it would be perceived if he came up: 'Archie is going to save us.'" Bradley missed nearly two months of the 2014 season after sustaining an elbow injury in late April. He began making rehab assignments at the end of June, with a 75-pitch limit. In only 18 season appearances and 83 innings, Bradley posted a 3–7 record, a 4.45 ERA, and 75 strikeouts in 2014.

Arizona Diamondbacks (2015–2020)

2015–2016

After Trevor Cahill was traded to the Atlanta Braves, Diamondbacks chief baseball officer Tony La Russa announced that Bradley would be in the team's 2015 starting rotation. He made his MLB debut on April 11, 2015, allowing only one hit in the Diamondbacks' 6–0 shutout of the Los Angeles Dodgers. He outpitched Clayton Kershaw, becoming only the fourth rookie starter since 2003 to win against a reigning Cy Young Award winner in his major league debut. On April 28, Bradley suffered a sinus fracture when he was hit in the face by a line drive off the bat of Colorado Rockies outfielder Carlos González, and he was placed on the 15-day disabled list the next day. Bradley struggled in his return to the mound, allowing four runs in less than three innings in his first start after the injury. He was placed on the disabled list again on June 4 with tendinitis in his shoulder, and began rehab assignments in mid-August. Bradley pitched  innings in eight games for the Diamondbacks in 2015, and posted a 2–3 record with a 5.80 ERA.

Amidst heavy competition for the fifth spot in the starting rotation, Bradley began the 2016 season in Reno. After recording a 1.99 ERA and 10.4 strikeouts per nine innings there, he was called back up on May 29 to replace an injured Shelby Miller, and set a career-high with nine strikeouts in  innings in a 6–3 win against the San Diego Padres. His performance that season was inconsistent, posting a 5.02 ERA and retaining the high walk rate that troubled him the previous season. His largest issues were in finding a usable third pitch to round out his fastball and curveball, and a high batting average against left-handed hitters. In 26 starts for Arizona that season, Bradley posted an 8–9 record, with 143 strikeouts but 79 earned runs allowed.

2017–2018
In 2017, the Diamondbacks had an unusually strong starting rotation, including Zack Greinke, Patrick Corbin, and Robbie Ray, and, rather than sending Bradley back down to the minor leagues, the team moved him to the bullpen. In his first appearance in his new role, Bradley relieved Randall Delgado in the fifth inning of a game against the San Francisco Giants, striking out seven batters in  shutout innings. He chose to remain in the bullpen even after Shelby Miller was optioned to the minor leagues, and began serving as the Diamondbacks' setup man. In the 2017 National League Wild Card Game, Bradley hit a two-RBI triple against Pat Neshek of the Colorado Rockies, helping Arizona advance to the 2017 National League Division Series. It was Bradley's first extra-base hit in his major league career and the first postseason triple by a reliever in MLB history. In his first season as a reliever, Bradley posted a 3–3 record and a 1.73 ERA in 73 innings.

Going into the 2018 season, Diamondbacks general manager Mike Hazen said that, while Bradley's role in the pitching lineup had not been formally addressed, it was likely that he would remain a reliever. Nearer to the start of the season, Bradley was considered for the role of closer, in contention with Brad Boxberger and Yoshihisa Hirano. Manager Torey Lovullo said that, while Bradley "was exceptional last year in the role he was in ... the other thought is he's ready to take the next step". His season took a turn on July 20, when he gave up six runs to the Colorado Rockies, including a grand slam off the bat of Raimel Tapia. Entering the game, Bradley had given up only 10 earned runs in  innings of work. His difficulties throughout the remainder of the season were later attributed to a cracked fingernail on his right index finger, which made it difficult for him to grip his signature curveball and forced him to rely more on his fastball. The Diamondbacks' bullpen collapsed in September, with Bradley, Jake Diekman, Matt Andriese, and Andrew Chafin all allowing at least as many runs as innings pitched. Bradley ended up going 4–5 for the season, with a 3.64 ERA, three saves, and 75 strikeouts in  innings.

2019–2020
His troubles continued into the beginning of the 2019 season, in which it took ten appearances before Bradley recorded a clean eighth inning for the Diamondbacks. His poor performance began to lead to speculation that he would be removed from his role as setup man. The following year, Bradley revealed to Arizona Sports 98.7 FM that, after giving up 32 hits, 16 walks, and 20 earned runs in May and June, Lovullo and Hazen called him in for a meeting and discussed how to return him to form without demoting him to the minors. His performance improved after the meeting, and after Greg Holland was designated for assignment that August, Bradley stepped up to close for the Diamondbacks. He posted a 4–5 record and 18 saves in 2019, with a 3.52 ERA and 87 strikeouts in 66 appearances, including 32 games finished.

During the 2020 offseason, Bradley underwent contract arbitration, arguing for a $4.1 million salary rather than the $3.625 million that the Diamondbacks had offered him. The arbitration committee ruled in favor of Bradley on February 21, making him the first largely non-closing reliever to make more than $4 million with fewer than 30 career saves. On July 18, after a delay in the MLB season due to the COVID-19 pandemic, Bradley was named the Diamondbacks' closer for the 2020 season. He made only 16 appearances for the club that season, going 2–0 with a 2.95 ERA.

Cincinnati Reds (2020)
On August 31, 2020, at the MLB trade deadline, the Diamondbacks traded Bradley to the Cincinnati Reds in exchange for utility player Josh VanMeter and outfielder Stuart Fairchild. He made his team debut on September 1, pitching  shutout innings in a 16–2 loss to the St. Louis Cardinals less than three hours after his plane arrived in Cincinnati. In the postseason, Bradley took the loss in the first game of the 2020 National League Wild Card Series, giving up two hits in the 13th inning against the Atlanta Braves. On December 2, Bradley was released from his contract alongside catcher Curt Casali, outfielder Brian Goodwin, and pitcher R. J. Alaniz. He recorded a 1.17 ERA in  innings with the Reds.

Philadelphia Phillies (2021)
On January 18, 2021, the Philadelphia Phillies announced that they had signed Bradley to a one-year, $6 million contract in an attempt to bolster their bullpen. That same day, he tweeted "#SignJT", a reference to the ongoing calls to the Phillies administration to re-sign free agent catcher J. T. Realmuto. It was projected, during the Phillies' 2021 "bullpen battle", that Bradley might take over the closer role from veteran Héctor Neris. On March 31, however, manager Joe Girardi said that Neris would maintain the ninth-inning position, with Bradley and José Alvarado serving as setup men.

Bradley was placed on the injured list on April 11 with an oblique strain, and was expected to miss three to four weeks. In his absence, Connor Brogdon was asked to take over Bradley's role, while JoJo Romero was called up to the majors. Bradley returned on May 18 for a game against the Miami Marlins, striking out the only batter he faced and taking the win. He became a free agent at the end of the season.

Los Angeles Angels (2022–present)
On March 18, 2022, Bradley signed a 1-year, $3.75 million contract with the Los Angeles Angels.

On June 26, Bradley broke his elbow during a brawl in a game against the Seattle Mariners, sidelining him for at least one month.

Pitcher profile
Bradley is a power pitcher who was praised for a successful transition from the starting rotation to the bullpen, working in both the eighth and ninth inning since 2017. The primary concern around his pitching in his first two MLB seasons was a high walk rate, something that he managed to cut in half in 2017, during his first season as a reliever. Bradley told The Ringer in 2018 that the biggest change he made since becoming a reliever was "just being aggressive—I'm trying to get ahead of guys and not walk guys."

For the early part of his career, Bradley largely possessed a two-pitch repertoire consisting of a fastball and a curveball. He pitched a cutter in the minor leagues, and began reintegrating it into his repertoire in 2017 after an unexplained pause. The following year, Bradley also began experimenting with a slider and a changeup to aid him in the bullpen. During the 2020 season, Bradley primarily threw three pitches. His  fastball made up 67 percent of his total pitches, while a  curveball was thrown 22 percent of the time, and a  changeup was thrown the other 11 percent.

Personal life
After being reassigned to the bullpen in 2017, Bradley began to grow a distinct beard, leading to jokes about the necessity of facial hair on a reliever. That season, the Diamondbacks began selling T-shirts with Bradley's face and the phrase "Bring in the Beard". Bradley told reporters that, growing up, he preferred to remain clean-shaven because he did not like how bright his beard appeared, but that he let it grow out after Movember and through spring training. After noticing an improvement in his pitching, Bradley decided to keep the beard, saying, "I don't believe in special powers but it's kind of funny that as soon as I grew a beard I seemed to pitch better". He clarified that he believed most of the improvement was due to the shorter inning workload placed on a reliever, but that, "Just in case the palm reader was correct, I won't shave my beard until I retire".

Bradley took up waterfowl hunting early in his baseball career, and continues to hunt in his free time. Bradley and his high school baseball teammate, Mak Monckton, connected with the gun club owner and started Crash Landing Outdoors, a hunting guide company. The name derives from Bradley's Labrador retriever, Crash.

References

External links

1992 births
Living people
Baseball players from Oklahoma
Sportspeople from Muskogee, Oklahoma
People from Broken Arrow, Oklahoma
Major League Baseball pitchers
Arizona Diamondbacks players
Cincinnati Reds players
Philadelphia Phillies players
Los Angeles Angels players
Missoula Osprey players
South Bend Silver Hawks players
Visalia Rawhide players
Mobile BayBears players
Reno Aces players
Arizona League Diamondbacks players